Trichosirius is a genus of small sea snails, marine gastropod molluscs in the family Capulidae (previously Trichotropidae).

Species
Species within the genus Trichosirius include:
 Trichosirius cavatocarinatus (Laws, 1940) 
 Trichosirius inornatus (Hutton, 1873) 
 Trichosirius octocarinatus (Powell, 1931)
 Trichosirius ornatus (Hutton, 1873) 
 † Trichosirius (Eosirius) admeteformis (Maxwell, 1966)
 † Trichosirius (Miplioderma) finlayi Laws, 1935
 † Trichosirius (Miplioderma) mangawera (Laws, 1940)
 † Trichosirius (Miplioderma) reticulatus (Suter, 1917)
 † Trichosirius (Miplioderma) waihuanus (Marwick, 1965)

References

Further reading 
 Powell A. W. B., New Zealand Mollusca, William Collins Publishers Ltd, Auckland, New Zealand 1979 
 Finlay H.J. 1926. A further commentary on New Zealand molluscan systematics. Transactions of the New Zealand Institute, 57: 320-485.

Capulidae
Gastropod genera
Taxa named by Harold John Finlay